Mosese Dawai (born 29 June 1998) is a Fijian rugby union player who plays for the  in Super Rugby. His playing position is wing. He was named in the Highlanders squad for the 2022 Super Rugby Pacific season. He was also a member of the  2021 Bunnings NPC squad.

References

External links
itsrugby.co.uk profile

1998 births
Fijian rugby union players
Living people
Rugby union wings
Waikato rugby union players
Highlanders (rugby union) players